Chiao can refer to:

 (properly ch'iao) Wade–Giles romanization of Qiao
 (properly chiao) Wade–Giles romanization of Jiao

People with the name
 Chiao Chiao (born 1943), Taiwanese film actress
 Leroy Chiao (born 1960), American chemical engineer and former NASA astronaut
 Raymond Chiao (born 1940), American physicist
 Roy Chiao (1927–1999), British Hong Kong-era Chinese actor

See also
 
 Joanne Tseng (born 1988), also known as Chih-chiao, Taiwanese actress and singer
 Ciao (disambiguation)